La jacquerie is a four-act opera commenced by Édouard Lalo in 1889 to a libretto by Édouard Blau and Simone Arnaud, based on the 1828 play of the same name by Prosper Mérimée. The opera was unfinished when Lalo died in 1892, and it was completed by Arthur Coquard. The first performance was at the Opéra de Monte-Carlo on 9 March 1895.

Creation
La jacquerie would have been Lalo's third opera (following Fiesque (1868) and Le roi d'Ys (1888)). Lalo died after having completed only the first act. Coquard, a pupil of César Franck, was requested by the director of the Monte-Carlo Opera, Raoul Gunsbourg, to compose the rest. Alexandre Dratwicki notes that the opera bears traces both of Richard Wagner and of Giacomo Meyerbeer (in particular the latter's Les Huguenots.)

Roles

Synopsis
There are four acts, each of about 20 minutes.
The opera is set in 1358, during the Jacquerie uprisings, in the village of Saint-Len de Cérent.  Robert is in love with the aristocratic Blanche. Seeking to protect her from the mob he is wounded by them and dies in Blanche's arms.

Performances
After its premiere in Monaco the opera was performed at Aix-les-bains in September and at the Opéra-Comique in Paris in December 1895. A critic wrote of it that the music was "small, but noisy". After this, the opera appears to have been ignored for over a century, but was given some performances in France in 2015.

Recording
With Véronique Gens (Blanche de Sainte-Croix), Nora Gubisch (Jeanne), Charles Castronovo (Robert), Boris Pinkhasovich (Guillaume), Jean-Sébastien Bou (Le Comte de Sainte-Croix), Patrick Bolleire (Le Sénéchal), Enguerrand de Hys (Le Baron de Savigny). Choeur de Radio France, Orchestre Philharmonique de Radio France, conducted by Patrick Davin. Released 2016. CD Ediciones Singulares Cat:ES1023.

References
Notes

 Sources
Anon (2015). "Edouard Lalo (1823-1892) between folklore and Wagnerism", website of the Bru-Zane Foundation, accessed 3 October 2015.
Dratwicki, Alexandre (2015). "Conaissez-vous la jacquerie?", on Radio France website, accessed 3 October 2015
 Lalo, Édouard and Arthur Coquard (1894). La jacquarie - vocal score, Paris: Choudens. Accessed on IMSLP website, 3 October 2015.
 L. K. (1895). "Coquard's 'La Jacquerie' ", New York Times, accessed 3 October 2015
 Philipp, Isidor (1895). "La Jacquerie" (review) in Le Ménestrel, Year 61 no.11 (17 March 1895), pp. 82–3, accessed 3 October 2015.

Operas
French-language operas
1895 operas
Unfinished operas
Operas completed by others
Operas set in France
Operas set in the 14th century
Operas by Édouard Lalo
Opera world premieres at the Opéra de Monte-Carlo
Operas based on works by Prosper Mérimée